3WAY FM (ACMA callsign: 3WAY) is an Australian community radio station based in Warrnambool, Victoria. Established in 1990, it broadcasts on frequency 103.7 FM and is a member of the Community Broadcasting Association of Australia.

TOM AND ALEX

References

External links 

3WAY FM  on CBAA website

Community radio stations in Australia
Radio stations in Victoria
Radio stations established in 1990
1990 establishments in Australia